Gastridiota is a monotypic genus consisting solely of Gastridiota adoxima, a moth of the family Bombycidae. The genus was erected by Alfred Jefferis Turner in 1922 but the species had been described by him in 1902 as Andraca adoxima. It is found in the subtropical east of Australia, from the Bunya Mountains and Montville in southern Queensland to north-eastern New South Wales.

The wingspan is about 30 mm. Adults have a uniform pale brown colour.

The larvae feed on Australian native Ficus species. They are mottled grey with yellow spots and have coloured tubercles on the first, second and last abdominal segments, a yellow head, and a yellow horn on the tail.

References

External links
Australian Faunal Directory

Moths of Australia
Bombycidae
Moths described in 1902
Monotypic moth genera